The Tarneit Football Club is an Australian rules football club, based in the western Melbourne suburb of Tarneit, which have competed in the Western Region Football League (WRFL) since 2014.

Operating out of Wootten Road Reserve in Tarneit, the Tarneit Football Club's vision is 'to be the community club; the place where the community come to join our ongoing pursuit of excellence, unity and success.'

As of the 2019 season, Tarneit is represented by seven junior teams, ranging from under 10s to under 16s; a senior women's team; and senior men's and reserves teams.

History

2014 - 2015: Formation and early years 
The formation of the Tarneit Football Club was officially announced by the WRFL in 2013, following the recognition of the rapidly increasing population in the outer west and the recent development of an Australian Rules facility on Wootten Road.

Tarneit was ultimately established in 2014, and in its inaugural year the club were able to field two senior and three junior teams, alongside successfully hosting local football finals at the Wootten Road venue. Starting initially in Division 2 grading, the club made history with its first senior men's victory in Round 1, scoring a 79 point win over the North Sunshine Roadrunners.

The 2015 season consisted of lukewarm success for Tarneit; aided by the introduction of a Division 3 compeititon, the senior men's team increased their win tally to five games and the reserves men's side winning thirteen games and playing in the club's first final. Tarneit was also able to sustain its  junior program in 2015, fielding three junior teams.

2016 - 2017: Increased participation and drastic improvement 
After two inaugural years of limited success, 2016 marked a drastic improvement in the club's on-field performances following the appointments of Mark Elso and Cam Evans as senior and reserves men's coach respectively. The senior men's side was able to secure its first ever finals victory after finishing the season in third position, whilst the reserve side featured in the club's first men's Grand Final - ultimately succumbing to Parkside by eight points. Similarly, the club experienced its first success in the junior ranks, with the Under 12s side playing in the club's first junior Grand Final.

The success of the previous year resulted in significant growth for the club in 2017, reflected by the introduction of Tarneit's first senior women's team and junior girls sides; contributing to a total of nine teams for the season. Although the women's team finished on the bottom of the table, another milestone for the club was achieved with the side securing their first ever victory against the Glen Orden Football Club

Tarneit's senior men also made history, with their qualification into the Division 3 Grand Final representing the club's first ever - an achievement that was soured by a loss to rivals Parkside by 41 points.

2018: Tarneit's first taste of success 
Following the performances of 2017, expectations for the men's teams were high, particularly following the re-signing of Elso and Evans for 2018. After finishing the season in second place - in a season where they scored a victory against each team - Tarneit's senior men's side could not improve on the previous year, crashing out of finals in straight sets following losses to Point Cook Centrals and the Wyndham Suns respectively.

Conversely, the reserves side were able to bounce back from a straight sets knockout in 2017 and finish the 2018 season as Minor Premiers en route to winning the club's first ever Premiership, with a one point victory over the Point Cook Centrals.

Tarneit also were able to maintain their junior numbers, with six junior sides representing the Titans alongside the senior men's, senior women's and reserve's sides.

2019: Reserves back-to-back and continued growth 
Tarneit's senior sides aimed to build on the momentum of their 2019 campaigns, and after five rounds looked strong with both sides undefeated at the top end of the ladder. This served to be a sliding doors moment for the teams; with the senior men going at a record of seven wins, six losses before crashing out in finals, while the reserves ultimately backed up their 2018 campaign with a 32 point victory in the Grand Final against the Albanvale Football Club.

The club's senior women's side also reveled in their own successes, with four wins for the season representing their strongest performance in Tarneit's short history.

2020: COVID-19 and new senior coach 
Due to the impact of COVID-19, the 2020 WRFL senior and junior seasons were cancelled respectively.

Following the cancellation of the senior season, Justin Palmer was announced as senior coach for 2021.

Honour Roll

References

External links 

 Official website of the Tarneit Titans Football Club

Australian rules football clubs in Melbourne
Australian rules football clubs established in 2014
2014 establishments in Australia
Western Region Football League clubs
Sport in the City of Wyndham